Narender Kumar Grewal (born 25 June 1998 is an Indian national men's basketball player from Bhiwani, Haryana. He plays Guard position .

References

External links 

 Fiba Profile

Living people
Indian men's basketball players
People from Bhiwani
Basketball players from Haryana
Basketball players at the 2014 Asian Games
Asian Games competitors for India
1998 births